Awanish Kumar Singh is an Indian politician. He is elected as Member of Legislative Council (MLC) from Lucknow (Graduates constituency), Uttar Pradesh in December 2020. He was previously the BJP regional vice president, Awadh Prant. He is an engineer by profession and a member of the Bharatiya Janata Party.

References 

Living people

Year of birth missing (living people)
Politicians from Lucknow
Bharatiya Janata Party politicians from Uttar Pradesh
Members of the Uttar Pradesh Legislative Council